Lafayette Township is one of the eighteen (the Village of Gloria Glen has broken off of Westfield Township and become a township) townships of Medina County, Ohio, United States.  The 2000 census found 4,329 people in the township.

Geography
Located in the central part of the county, it borders the following townships:
York Township - north
Medina Township - northeast
Montville Township - east
Guilford Township - southeast corner
Westfield Township - south
Harrisville Township - southwest corner
Chatham Township - west
Litchfield Township - northwest corner

Two municipalities are located in Lafayette Township: the village of Chippewa Lake in the southeast, and part of the city of Medina, the county seat of Medina County, in the northeast.

Name and history
Statewide, the only other Lafayette Township is located in Coshocton County.

Government
The township is governed by a three-member board of trustees, who are elected in November of odd-numbered years to a four-year term beginning on the following January 1. Two are elected in the year after the presidential election and one is elected in the year before it. There is also an elected township fiscal officer, who serves a four-year term beginning on April 1 of the year after the election, which is held in November of the year before the presidential election. Vacancies in the fiscal officership or on the board of trustees are filled by the remaining trustees.

As of 2008 the board was composed of Lynda Bowers, Don Butler, and Lee Kehoe (president), and the fiscal officer was Shirley Bailey.

References

External links
Township website
County website

Townships in Medina County, Ohio
Townships in Ohio